Mikhail Chumachenko is a leader of the Donbas People's Militia and a Ukrainian separatist who was detained by the Security Service of Ukraine on March 22, 2014.

External links
 In Donetsk SBU detained the leader of the Donetsk People's Militia. Censor.net. March 22, 2014

Living people
Pro-Russian people of the 2014 pro-Russian unrest in Ukraine
People of the Donetsk People's Republic
Russian nationalists
Year of birth missing (living people)
Place of birth missing (living people)